The SS British Premier was a tanker built by Palmers Shipbuilding and Iron Company in 1922, registered in London and operated by the British Tanker Company.

During the Second World War, she was used on convoy duties to bring oil from the Persian Gulf around the Cape of Good Hope and to the United Kingdom  She was part of Convoy SLS-60 in late December 1940, but was straggling behind the main group when she came under attack by a German U-boat and was sunk with heavy loss of life.

Her final convoy was to have taken her from Abadan to Swansea, via Freetown, which she reached on 22 December. At 16:41, U-65 torpedoed and sank British Premier. She went down with the loss of 32 of her crew. There were thirteen survivors, nine of whom were later picked up by the cruiser  on 3 January 1941 and taken to Freetown. The remaining four were not picked up until 3 February, when they were rescued by the destroyer , having spent 41 days in an open boat, 25 of those days without any food.

References

Ships sunk by German submarines in World War II
Steamships of the United Kingdom
World War II shipwrecks in the Atlantic Ocean
Ships built on the River Tyne
World War II merchant ships of the United Kingdom
1922 ships
Maritime incidents in December 1940
Ships of BP Shipping
Anglo-Persian Oil Company